Claudia Salman-Rath ( Rath; born 25 April 1986, in Hadamar) is a German athlete who specialises in the heptathlon.

Rath represented Germany at the 2010 European Championships in Athletics where she finished 11th in the heptathlon, scoring a personal best of 6107 points. She followed this up with a win at the national heptathlon championships, scoring 5746 points.

International competitions

References

External links 
 
  
 
 
 
 
  
 

1986 births
Living people
People from Hadamar
Sportspeople from Giessen (region)
German heptathletes
World Athletics Championships athletes for Germany
Athletes (track and field) at the 2016 Summer Olympics
Olympic athletes of Germany